Acamptodaphne is a genus of sea snails, marine gastropod mollusks in the family Raphitomidae.

Species
Species within the genus Acamptodaphne include:
 Acamptodaphne biconica (Schepman, 1913)
 Acamptodaphne eridmata Morassi & Bonfitto, 2010
 Acamptodaphne solomonensis Morassi & Bonfitto, 2010

References

 Morassi & Bonfitto, New raphitomine gastropods (Gastropoda: Conidae: Raphitominae) from the South-West Pacific

External links
  Bouchet, P.; Kantor, Y. I.; Sysoev, A.; Puillandre, N. (2011). A new operational classification of the Conoidea (Gastropoda). Journal of Molluscan Studies. 77(3): 273-308

 
Raphitomidae
Gastropod genera